Tirukattupalli Aranyeswarar Temple (திருக்காட்டுப்பள்ளி ஆரண்யேஸ்வரர் கோயில்) is a Hindu temple located at Keezhai Tirukattupalli in Mayiladuthurai district of Tamil Nadu, India.  The presiding deity is Shiva. He is called as Aranyeswarar. His consort is known as Akhilandeswari.

Significance 
It is one of the shrines of the 275 Paadal Petra Sthalams - Shiva Sthalams glorified in the early medieval Tevaram poems by Tamil Saivite Nayanar Tirugnanasambandar. The Devas are believed to have worshipped Shiva in this temple.

Literary mention 
Tirugnanasambandar describes the feature of the deity as:

References

External links 
 
 

Shiva temples in Mayiladuthurai district
Padal Petra Stalam